This is a list of senior high schools operating in the state of Pennsylvania:

Adams County

 Bermudian Springs High School, York Springs
 Biglerville High School, Biglerville
 Delone Catholic High School, McSherrystown
 Fairfield Area High School, Fairfield
 Littlestown High School, Littlestown
 New Oxford High School, New Oxford

Gettysburg

 Adams County Christian Academy
 Freedom Christian School
 Gettysburg Area High School

Allegheny County

Eastern

 Cheswick Christian Academy, Cheswick
 East Allegheny Junior/Senior High School, North Versailles
 Gateway High School, Monroeville
 Penn Hills High School, Penn Hills
 Plum High School, Plum
 Riverview High School, Oakmont
 Redeemer Lutheran School, Verona
 Trinity Christian School, Forest Hills
 Western Pennsylvania School for the Deaf Edgewood

Northern

 Deer Lakes High School, Russellton
 Eden Christian Academy, North Hills/Sewickley/Wexford
 Fox Chapel Area High School, Fox Chapel
 Hampton High School, Allison Park
 North Allegheny Intermediate High School, McCandless
 North Allegheny Senior High School, Wexford
 North Hills Senior High School Ross Township
 Shaler Area High School, Shaler Township
 Springdale Junior/Senior High School, Springdale

Gibsonia

 Aquinas Academy
 Pine-Richland High School

Natrona Heights

 Harvest Baptist Academy
 Highlands High School
 St. Joseph High School

Southern

 Baldwin High School, Baldwin
 Brentwood High School, Brentwood
 Carlynton Junior/Senior High School, Carnegie
 Chartiers Valley High School, Bridgeville
 Clairton High School, Clairton
 Elizabeth Forward High School, Elizabeth
 Mount Lebanon High School, Mount Lebanon
 South Park High School, South Park
 Steel Valley High School, Munhall
 Thomas Jefferson High School, Jefferson Hills
 Upper St. Clair High School, Upper St. Clair

McKeesport

 McKeesport Area High School
 Serra Catholic High School
 South Allegheny Middle/Senior High School

West Mifflin

 Cornerstone Christian Prep Wilson Campus
 West Mifflin Area High School
 Wilson Christian Academy

Western

 Quaker Valley High School, Leetsdale
 Sewickley Academy, Sewickley
 South Fayette Township High School, McDonald
 West Allegheny High School, Imperial

Coraopolis

 Cornell High School
 Moon Area High School
 Our Lady of the Sacred Heart High School

McKees Rocks

 Montour High School
 Robinson Township Christian School
 Sto-Rox High School

Pittsburgh

 Avonworth High School
 Bishop Canevin High School
 Brashear High School
 Carrick High School
 City Charter High School
 The Ellis School
 Imani Christian Academy
 Keystone Oaks High School
 Langley High School
 Nazareth Prep
 The Neighborhood Academy
 Northgate Junior - Senior High School
 Oakland Catholic High School
 Perry Traditional Academy
 Pittsburgh Central Catholic High School
 Pittsburgh Creative and Performing Arts 6-12
 Pittsburgh Obama 6-12
 Seton-La Salle Catholic High School
 Shady Side Academy
 South Vocational-Technology High School
 Taylor Allderdice High School
 Three Rivers Village School
 The University School
 University Preparatory School 
 Urban Pathways Charter School
 Westinghouse High School
 Winchester Thurston School
 Woodland Hills High School
 Yeshiva Schools of Pittsburgh

Armstrong County

 Apollo-Ridge High School, Spring Church
 Armstrong Junior/Senior High School, Kittanning
 Freeport Area High School, Freeport
 Leechburg High School, Leechburg
 Lenape Technical School, Ford City
 West Shamokin Junior/Senior High School, Rural Valley

Beaver County

 Ambridge Area High School, Ambridge
 Beaver Area High School, Beaver
 Blackhawk High School, Chippewa Township
 Central Valley High School, Monaca, Center Township
 Freedom Area High School, Freedom
 Lincoln Park Performing Arts Charter School, Midland
 New Brighton Area High School, New Brighton
 Quigley Catholic High School, Baden
 Riverside High School, Ellwood City
 Rochester Area High School, Rochester
 South Side High School, Hookstown
 Western Beaver Junior/Senior High School, Industry

Aliquippa

 Aliquippa High School
 Bethel Christian School
 Hopewell High School

Beaver Falls

 Beaver County Christian High School
 Big Beaver Falls High School

Bedford County

 Bedford High School, Bedford
 Chestnut Ridge Senior High School, New Paris
 Everett Area Junior/Senior High School, Everett
 HOPE for Hyndman Charter School Hyndman
 Northern Bedford County Middle/High School, Loysburg
 Tussey Mountain Junior/Senior High School, Saxton

Berks County

Central

 Governor Mifflin Senior High School, Shillington
 Muhlenberg High School, Laureldale
 Schuylkill Valley High School, Leesport
 Wilson Senior High School, West Lawn
 Wyomissing Area Junior/Senior High School, Wyomissing

Eastern

 Boyertown Area High School, Boyertown
 Exeter Township Senior High School, Exeter Township
 Oley Valley High School, Oley Township
 Pine Forge Academy, Pine Forge

Northern

 Brandywine Heights High School, Topton
 Fleetwood Area High School, Fleetwood
 The King's Academy, Mohrsville
 Kutztown Area High School, Kutztown

Hamburg

 Blue Mountain Academy
 Hamburg Area High School

Southern

 Conestoga Christian School, Morgantown
 Twin Valley High School, Elverson

Birdsboro

 Berks Christian School
 Daniel Boone Area High School

Reading

 Antietam Middle/High School
 Berks Catholic High School
 Reading Senior High School

Western

 Conrad Weiser High School, Robesonia
 Tulpehocken Junior/Senior High School, Bernville

Blair County

 Bellwood-Antis High School, Bellwood
 Central High School, Martinsburg
 Claysburg-Kimmel High School, Claysburg
 Hollidaysburg Area High School, Hollidaysburg
 Williamsburg Community Junior/Senior High School, Williamsburg

Altoona

 Altoona Area High School
 Bishop Guilfoyle High School

Tyrone

 Greater Altoona Career and Technology Center
 The Grier School
 Tyrone Area High School

Bradford County

 Athens Area High School, Athens Township
 Canton Junior Senior High School, Canton
 Sayre Area High School, Sayre
 Towanda Area High School, Towanda
 Troy Area High School, Troy
 Wyalusing Valley Junior-Senior High School, Wyalusing

Rome

 North Rome Christian School
 Northeast Bradford Junior/Senior High School

Bucks County

Central

 Central Bucks High School East, Buckingham
 Central Bucks High School South, Warrington
 Central Bucks High School West, Doylestown
 Middle Bucks Institute of Technology, Jamison

New Hope

 New Hope-Solebury High School
 Solebury School

Newtown

 Council Rock High School North
 George School

Warminster

Archbishop Wood Catholic High School
 William Tennent High School

Eastern

 Bristol High School, Bristol
 Council Rock High School South, Holland
 Harry S. Truman High School, Levittown
 Morrisville Middle/Senior High School, Morrisville
 Neshaminy High School, Langhorne
 Villa Joseph Marie High School, Southampton

Bensalem

 Bensalem Township High School
 Holy Ghost Preparatory School
 School Lane Charter School

Fairless Hills

 Bucks County Technical High School
Conwell-Egan Catholic High School
 Pennsbury High School

Northern

 Palisades High School, Kintnersville
 Plumstead Christian School, Plumsteadville
 Upper Bucks Christian School, Sellersville

Perkasie

 Pennridge High School
 Upper Bucks County Technical School

Quakertown

 Faith Christian Academy
 Quakertown Christian School
 Quakertown Community High School

Butler County

 Karns City High School, Karns City
 Knoch High School, Saxonburg
 Mars Area High School, Mars
 Moniteau Junior/Senior High School, West Sunbury
 North Catholic High School Cranberry Township
 Seneca Valley High School, Harmony
 Slippery Rock Area High School, Slippery Rock
 Summit Academy, Herman

Butler

 Butler High School
 Butler County Area Vo-Tech School
 First Baptist Christian School

Cambria County

 Blacklick Valley Junior Senior High School, Nanty-Glo
 Cambria Heights High School, Patton
 Forest Hills High School, Sidman
 Glendale Junior/Senior High School, Flinton
 Northern Cambria High School, Northern Cambria
 Penn Cambria High School, Cresson
 Portage Area High School, Portage

Ebensburg

 Admiral Peary Vocational-Technical School
 Bishop Carroll High School
 Central Cambria High School

Johnstown

 Bishop McCort High School
 Conemaugh Valley Junior/Senior High School
 Ferndale Area Junior/Senior High School
 Greater Johnstown High School
 Greater Johnstown Vo-Tech School
 Richland Senior High School
 Westmont Hilltop High School

Cameron County
 Cameron County High School, Emporium

Carbon County

 Lehighton Area High School, Lehighton
 Palmerton Area High School, Palmerton
 Panther Valley High School, Lansford
 Weatherly Area High School, Weatherly

Jim Thorpe

 Carbon Career and Technical Institute
 Jim Thorpe Area High School

Centre County

 Bald Eagle Area High School
 Penns Valley Area High School, Spring Mills
 Philipsburg-Osceola Area High School, Philipsburg
 Saint Joseph's Catholic Academy, Boalsburg

Bellefonte

 Bellefonte Area High School
 Centre County Christian Academy

State College

 Grace Prep High School
 State College Area High School

Chester County

 Coatesville Area High School, Coatesville
 Conestoga High School, Berwyn
 Devon Preparatory School, Devon
 Octorara High School, Atglen
 Owen J. Roberts High School, Bucktown
 Oxford Area High School, Oxford
 Twin Valley High School, Elverson
 West Chester East High School, West Goshen Twp
 West Chester Technical High School, West Chester
 Woodlynde School, Strafford

Downington

 Bishop Shanahan High School
 Downingtown STEM Academy
 Downingtown West High School
 Technical College High School Brandywine

Exton

 Collegium Charter School
 Downingtown East High School

Kennett Square

 Kennett High School
 Unionville High School

Malvern

 Great Valley High School
 Malvern Preparatory School
 The Phelps School
 Villa Maria Academy

Paoli

 Church Farm School
 Delaware Valley Friends School

Phoenixville

 Kimberton Waldorf School
 Phoenixville Area High School
 Renaissance Academy Charter School
 Technical College High School Pickering

West Chester

 Henderson High School
 West Chester Christian School

West Grove

 Avon Grove High School
 Avon Grove Charter School
 Technical College High School Pennock's Bridge

Westtown Twp

 West Chester Rustin High School
 Westtown School

Clarion County

 Allegheny-Clarion Valley Junior/Senior High School, Foxburg
 Clarion Area High School, Clarion
 Clarion-Limestone Area Junior/Senior High School, Strattanville
 Keystone Junior/Senior High School, Knox
 North Clarion County Junior/Senior High School,  Tionesta
 Redbank Valley Junior/Senior High School, New Bethlehem
 Union Junior/Senior High School, Rimersburg

Clearfield County

 Curwensville Area Junior/Senior High School, Curwensville
 Harmony Area High School, Westover
 Moshannon Valley Junior/Senior High School, Houtzdale
 West Branch Area Junior/Senior High School, Morrisdale

Clearfield

 Clearfield Alliance Christian School
 Clearfield Area Junior/Senior High School

DuBois

 Central Catholic High School
 DuBois Area Senior High School

Clinton County

 Bucktail High School, Renovo
 Central Mountain High School, Mill Hall
 Sugar Valley Rural Charter School, Loganton
 Walnut Street Christian School, Avis

Columbia County

 Benton Area High School, Benton
 Berwick Area Senior High School, Berwick
 Millville Area Junior Senior High School, Millville
 Southern Columbia Area High School, Catawissa

Bloomsburg

 Bloomsburg High School
 Central Columbia High School
 Columbia County Christian School
 Columbia-Montour Area Vocational-Technical School

Crawford County

 Cambridge Springs Junior/Senior High School, Cambridge Springs
 Cochranton Junior/Senior High School, Cochranton
 Conneaut Area Senior High School, Linesville
 Maplewood Junior/Senior High School, Guys Mills
 Saegertown Junior/Senior High School, Saegertown
 Titusville Area High School, Titusville

Meadville

 Crawford County Career and Technical Center
 Crawford Christian Academy
 Meadville Area High School

Cumberland County

 Big Spring High School, Newville
 Boiling Springs High School, Boiling Springs
 East Pennsboro Area High School, Enola
 Harrisburg Academy, Wormleysburg
 Shippensburg Area High School, Shippensburg
 West Shore Christian Academy, Shiremanstown

Camp Hill

 Camp Hill High School
 Cedar Cliff High School
 Trinity High School

Carlisle

 Carlisle Christian Academy
 Carlisle High School

Mechanicsburg

 Cumberland Valley High School
 Cumberland-Perry Area Career & Technical Center
 Mechanicsburg Area High School

Dauphin County

 Halifax Area High School, Halifax
 Harrisburg Christian School, Linglestown
 Lower Dauphin High School, Hummelstown
 Middletown Area High School, Middletown
 Steelton-Highspire High School, Steelton
 Upper Dauphin Area High School, Elizabethville

Harrisburg

 Bishop McDevitt High School
 Capital Area School for the Arts
 Central Dauphin East High School
 Central Dauphin High School
 Covenant Christian Academy
 The Circle School
 Dauphin County Technical School
 Harrisburg High School
 SciTech High
 Susquehanna Township High School

Hershey

 Hershey High School
 Milton Hershey School

Millersburg

 Millersburg Area High School
 Northern Dauphin Christian School

Delaware County

Eastern

 Academy Park High School, Sharon Hill
 Academy of Notre Dame de Namur, Villanova
 Delaware County Technical High School, Folcroft
 The Haverford School, Haverford
 Haverford Senior High School, Havertown
 Interboro High School, Prospect Park
 Penn Wood High School, Lansdowne
 Ridley High School, Ridley Twp
 Valley Forge Military Academy and College, Wayne

Drexel Hill

 Bonner & Prendergast Catholic High School
 Upper Darby High School

Newtown Square

 Delaware County Christian School
 Episcopal Academy
 Marple Newtown High School

Radnor

 Archbishop Carroll High School
 Hill Top Preparatory School
 Radnor High School

Rosemont

 Agnes Irwin School
 Hill Top Preparatory School

Springfield

 Cardinal O'Hara High School
 Springfield High School

Western

 Chichester High School, Boothwyn
 The Christian Academy, Brookhaven
 Garnet Valley High School, Concord Twp
 Penncrest High School, Media
 Strath Haven High School, Wallingford

Aston

 Delaware County Technical High School
 Sun Valley High School

Chester

 Chester Charter Scholars Academy
 Chester High School
 Stem Academy at Showalter

Elk County

 Johnsonburg Area High School, Johnsonburg
 Ridgway Area High School, Ridgway

St. Marys

 Elk County Catholic High School
 St. Mary's Area High School

Erie County

 Corry Area Middle/High School, Corry
 Fairview High School, Fairview
 Fort Leboeuf High School, Waterford
 General McLane High School, Edinboro
 Girard High School, Girard
 Harbor Creek Junior/Senior High School, Harborcreek
 North East High School, North East
 Northwestern High School, Albion
 Union City High School, Union City

Erie

 Bethel Christian School
 Cathedral Preparatory School/Villa Maria Academy
 Central Tech High School
 Charter School of Excellence
 Erie High School
 Erie County Technical School
 Erie First Christian Academy
 Iroquois Junior/Senior High School
 McDowell High School
 Mercyhurst Preparatory School
 Northwest Pennsylvania Collegiate Academy
 R.B. Wiley Community Charter School
 Seneca High School

Fayette County

 Brownsville Area High School, Brownsville
 Frazier High School, Perryopolis
 Mt. Carmel Christian School, Mount Pleasant

Connellsville

 Connellsville Area Career and Technology Center
 Connellsville Area Senior High School
 Geibel Catholic High School

Uniontown

 Albert Gallatin High School
 Chestnut Ridge Christian Academy
 Fayette County Career and Technical Institute
 Laurel Highlands High School
 St. John the Evangelist Regional Catholic School
 Uniontown Area High School

Forest County

 East Forest High School, Marienville
 West Forest Junior/Senior High School, Tionesta

Franklin County

 Fannett-Metal High School, Willow Hill
 Greencastle-Antrim High School, Greencastle
 Waynesboro Area Senior High School, Waynesboro

Chambersburg

 Chambersburg Area Career Magnet School
 Chambersburg Area Senior High School
 Cumberland Valley Christian School
 Franklin County Career and Technology Center
 Shalom Christian Academy

Mercersburg

 James Buchanan High School
 Mercersburg Academy

Fulton County

 Forbes Road Junior/Senior High School, Waterfall
 Southern Fulton Junior/Senior High School, Warfordsburg

McConnellsburg

 McConnellsburg High School
 Fulton County Center for Career and Technology

Greene County

 Carmichaels Area Junior/Senior High School, Carmichaels
 Jefferson-Morgan Middle/High School, Jefferson
 Mapletown Junior/Senior High School, Greensboro

Waynesburg

 Greene County Career & Technical Center
 Waynesburg Central High School
 West Greene High School

Huntingdon County

 Huntingdon County Career & Technical Center, Mill Creek
 Juniata Valley Junior/Senior High School, Alexandria
 Mount Union Area Junior/Senior High School, Mount Union
 Southern Huntingdon County Middle/High School, Three Springs

Huntingdon

 Calvary Christian Academy
 Huntingdon Area Senior High School
 New Day Charter School

Indiana County

 Blairsville Middle-High School, Blairsville
 Homer-Center Junior/Senior High School, Homer City
 Marion Center Area High School, Marion Center
 Penns Manor Area Junior/Senior High School, Clymer
 Purchase Line Junior/Senior High School, Commodore
 Saltsburg Junior/Senior High School, Saltsburg
 Seeds of Faith Christian Academy, Creekside
 United Junior/Senior High School, Armagh

Indiana

 Indiana Area High School
 Indiana County Technology Center

Jefferson County

 Brockway Area Junior/Senior High School, Brockway
 Brookville Area Jr./Sr. High School, Brookville
 Christ's Dominion Academy, Summerville
 Jefferson County Vocational School, Reynoldsville
 Punxsutawney Area High School, Punxsutawney

Juniata County
 Juniata High School, Mifflintown

McAlisterville

 East Juniata Junior/Senior High School
 Juniata Christian School

Lackawanna County

 Abington Heights High School, Clarks Summit
 Carbondale Area Junior Senior High School, Carbondale
 Lakeland Junior-Senior High School, Jermyn
 Mid Valley Secondary Center, Throop
 Old Forge Junior/Senior High School, Old Forge
 Riverside Junior/Senior High School, Taylor
 Summit Christian Academy, South Abington Township
 Valley View High School, Archbald

Dunmore

 Dunmore High School
 Holy Cross High School

Moscow

 North Pocono High School
 St. Gregory's Academy

Scranton

 Career Technology Center of Lackawanna County
 Holy Cross High School
 Scranton High School
 Scranton Preparatory School
 West Scranton High School

Lancaster County

Eastern

 Garden Spot High School, New Holland
 Manheim Central High School, Manheim
 Manheim Township High School, Manheim Twp
 Terre Hill Mennonite High School, Terre Hill
 Veritas Academy, Leola

Kinzers

 Faith Mennonite High School
 Pequea Valley High School

Northern

 Cocalico Senior High School, Denver
 Lancaster County Career & Technical Center, Brownstown

Ephrata

 Ephrata Senior High School
 Ephrata Mennonite School

Lititz

 Linden Hall School
 Lititz Christian School
 Warwick High School

Southern

 Lampeter-Strasburg High School, Lampeter
 Lancaster County Career & Technical Center, Willow Street
 Penn Manor High School, Millersville
 Solanco High School, Quarryville

Western

 Columbia Junior/Senior High School, Columbia
 Dayspring Christian Academy, Mountville
 Hempfield High School, Landisville

Elizabethtown

 Elizabethtown Area High School
 Mt. Calvary Christian School

Mount Joy

 Donegal High School
 The Janus School

Lancaster

 Conestoga Valley High School
 J. P. McCaskey High School
 La Academia Partnership Charter School
 Lancaster Catholic High School
 Lancaster Country Day School
 Lancaster Mennonite School
 Phoenix Academy

Lawrence County

 Lincoln High School, Ellwood City
 Mohawk High School, Bessemer
 Shenango High School, Shenango Twp
 Wilmington Area High School, New Wilmington

New Castle

 Laurel Junior/Senior High School
 Lawrence County Career & Technical Center
 Neshannock Township Junior/Senior High School
 New Castle Junior/Senior High School
 Union Area High School

Lebanon County

 Annville-Cleona Junior/Senior High School, Annville
 Eastern Lebanon County High School, Myerstown
 Northern Lebanon High School, Fredericksburg
 Palmyra Area High School, Palmyra

Lebanon

 Cedar Crest High School
 Lebanon Catholic High School
 Lebanon County Career & Technology Center
 Lebanon High School
 New Covenant Christian School

Lehigh County

 Emmaus High School, Emmaus
 Lehigh Career and Technical Institute, Schnencksville
 Northern Lehigh High School, Slatington
 Northwestern Lehigh High School, Tripoli
 Parkland High School, South Whitehall Township
 Salem Christian School, Macungie
 Salisbury High School, Salisbury Twp
 Southern Lehigh High School, Center Valley
 Whitehall High School, Whitehall

Allentown

 Allentown Central Catholic High School
 Building 21 Allentown
 Executive Education Academy Charter School
 Lincoln Leadership Academy Charter School
 Louis E. Dieruff High School
 Roberto Clemente Charter School
 William Allen High School

Luzerne County

Central

 Greater Nanticoke Area High School, Nanticoke
 Northwest Area High School, Shickshinny

Eastern

 Crestwood High School, Mountain Top
 Hanover Area Junior/Senior High School, Hanover Twp
 Hazleton Area Career Center, Hazle Twp 
 Hazleton Area High School, Hazleton
 Holy Redeemer High School, Wilkes-Barre
 MMI Preparatory School, Freeland
 Wyoming Valley West High School, Plymouth

Northern

 Dallas High School, Dallas
 Lake-Lehman Junior/Senior High School, Lehman
 Pittston Area High School, Pittston
 West Side Career & Technology Center, Pringle
 Wyoming Area Secondary Center, Exeter
 Wyoming Seminary Upper School, Kingston

Plains

 Wilkes-Barre Area High School
 Wilkes-Barre Area Career & Technical Center

Lycoming County

 Jersey Shore Area High School, Jersey Shore
 Loyalsock Township High School, Loyalsock Twp
 Montgomery Area High School, Montgomery
 Montoursville Area High School, Montoursville
 Muncy Junior-Senior High School, Muncy
 South Williamsport Area Junior Senior High School, South Williamsport

Hughesville

 Hughesville Junior Senior High School
 Lycoming Career & Technology Center

Williamsport

 St. John Neumann Regional Academy High School
 Williamsport Area High School

McKean County

 Bradford Area High School, Bradford
 Kane Area High School, Kane
 Otto-Eldred High School, Duke Center
 Smethport Area High School, Smethport

Port Allegany

 Port Allegany High School
 Seneca Highlands Career & Technical Center

Mercer County

 Commodore Perry High School, Hadley
 Farrell Area High School, Farrell
 Grove City Area High School, Grove City
 Jamestown Area Junior/Senior High School, Jamestown
 Lakeview High School, Stoneboro
 Sharon High School, Sharon
 Sharpsville Area High School, Sharpsville
 West Middlesex High School, West Middlesex

Greenville

 Greenville High School
 Keystone Charter School
 Reynolds High School

Hermitage

 Hickory High School
 Kennedy Catholic High School

Mercer

 Mercer Area Junior/Senior High School
 Mercer County Career & Technical Center

Mifflin County
 Mifflin County High School

Monroe County

 Evergreen Community Charter School, Cresco
 Pleasant Valley High School, Brodheadsville
 Monroe Career & Technical Institute, Bartonsville
 Pocono Mountain East High School, Swiftwater
 Pocono Mountain West High School, Pocono Summit
 Stroudsburg High School, Stroudsburg

East Stroudsburg

 East Stroudsburg High School South
 Notre Dame High School

Montgomery County

Eastern

 Abington Senior High School, Abington Twp
 Academy of the New Church, Bryn Athyn
 Cheltenham High School, Wyncote
 Hatboro-Horsham High School, Horsham
 La Salle College High School, Wyndmoor
 Mount Saint Joseph Academy, Flourtown

Erdenheim

 Philadelphia-Montgomery Christian Academy
 Springfield Township High School

Fort Washington

 Germantown Academy
 Upper Dublin High School

Huntingdon Valley

 Huntingdon Valley Christian Academy
 Lower Moreland High School

Jenkintown

 Abington Friends School
 Jenkintown High School

Willow Grove

 Eastern Center for Arts & Technology
 Upper Moreland High School

Northern

 Gwynedd Mercy Academy, Gwynedd Valley
 Souderton Area High School, Souderton
 Wissahickon High School, Ambler

Lansdale

 Calvary Baptist School
 Lansdale Catholic High School
 Dock Mennonite Academy
 North Montco Technical Career Center
 North Penn High School

Pennsburg

 The Perkiomen School
 Upper Perkiomen High School

Southern

 AIM Academy, Conshohocken
 Friends' Central School, Wynnewood
 Harriton High School, Rosemont
 Kosloff Torah Academy, Bala Cynwyd
 Lower Merion High School, Ardmore
 Merion Mercy Academy, Merion
 Upper Merion Area High School, King of Prussia

Bryn Mawr

 The Baldwin School
 Barrack Hebrew Academy
 The Shipley School

Norristown

 Norristown Area High School
 Roosevelt Alternative High School

Plymouth Meeting

 Central Montco Technical High School
 Plymouth-Whitemarsh High School

Western

 Methacton High School, Eagleville
 Pottsgrove High School, Pottsgrove

Collegeville

 Perkiomen Valley High School
 Valley Forge Baptist Academy

Pottstown

 Coventry Christian Schools
 The Hill School
 Pottstown High School
 West-Mont Christian Academy

Royersford

 Pope John Pope II High School
 Spring-Ford High School
 Western Montgomery Career & Technology Center

Montour County
 Danville High School, Danville

Northampton County

 Bangor Area High School, Bangor
 Nazareth Area High School, Nazareth
 Pen Argyl Area High School, Pen Argyl
 Saucon Valley High School, Hellertown

Bethlehem

 Bethlehem Area Vocational-Technical School
 Bethlehem Catholic High School
 Freedom High School
 Lehigh Valley Academy Regional Charter School
 Lehigh Valley Charter High School for the Arts
 Liberty High School
 Moravian Academy

Easton

 Career Institute of Technology
 Easton Area High School
 Notre Dame High School
 Wilson Area High School

Northampton

 Catasauqua High School
 Northampton Area High School

Northumberland County

 Line Mountain Jr./Sr. High School, Herndon
 Mount Carmel Area High School, Mount Carmel
 Northumberland Christian School, Northumberland
 Shikellamy High School, Sunbury
 Warrior Run High School, Turbotville

Coal Township

 Northumberland County Career Technology Center
 Our Lady of Lourdes Regional School
 Shamokin Area High School

Milton

 Meadowbrook Christian School 
 Milton Area High School

Perry County

 Greenwood High School, Millerstown
 Newport High School, Newport
 Susquenita High School, Duncannon
 West Perry High School, Elliottsburg

Philadelphia County (City of Philadelphia)

Neighborhood

 John Bartram High School
 Thomas A. Edison High School
 Samuel Fels High School
 Frankford High School
 Benjamin Franklin High School
 Horace Furness High School
 Kensington High School
 Martin Luther King High School
 Abraham Lincoln High School
 Northeast High School
 Overbrook High School
 Penn Treaty School (6-12)
 Roxborough High School
 William L. Sayre High School
 South Philadelphia High School
 Strawberry Mansion High School
 George Washington High School
 West Philadelphia High School

Special Admissions

 Academy at Palumbo
 The Arts Academy at Benjamin Rush
 Bodine International Affairs
 CAPA
 Carver High School for Engineering and Science
 Central High School
 GAMP
 Franklin Learning Center
 Hill-Freedman World Academy High School
 Julia R. Masterman School
 Kensington Creative & Performing Arts High School
 Kensington Health Sciences Academy High School
 Parkway Center City High School
 Parkway Northwest High School
 Parkway West High School
 Philadelphia High School for Girls
 Philadelphia Learning Academy
 Philadelphia Military Academy
 Philadelphia Virtual Academy
 Science Leadership Academy
 Science Leadership Academy at Beeber (6-12)
 The LINC
 Walter Biddle Saul High School for Agricultural Sciences

Magnet/Citywide Admission

 Building 21
 Constitution High School
 Murrell Dobbins Vocational School
 High School of the Future
 Lankenau High School
 Jules E. Mastbaum Technical High School
 Microsoft's School of the Future
 Motivation High School
 Paul Robeson High School for Human Services
 Randolph Technical High School
 The U School
 The Workshop School
 Swenson Arts and Technology High School
 Vaux Big Picture High School

Charter

 Belmont Charter High School
 Boys' Latin of Philadelphia Charter School
 Community Academy of Philadelphia
 Electric & Technology Charter High School
 Esperanza Academy Charter School
 First Philadelphia Preparatory Charter School
 Franklin Towne Charter School
 Freire Charter School
 Imhotep Institute Charter High School
 KIPP Charter Schools
 Olney High School
 Mariana Bracetti Academy Charter School
 Maritime Academy Charter School
 Mastery Charter Schools (Gratz, Lenfest, Pickett, Shoemaker, Thomas, Hardy Williams)
 MaST Charter Schools (Community, II, III) 
 Mathematics, Civics and Sciences Charter School
 Multicultural Academy Charter School
 New Foundations Charter School
 Philadelphia Academy Charter School
 Philadelphia Performing Arts Charter School
 Preparatory Charter School of Mathematics, Science, Technology & Careers
 Sankofa Freedom Academy Charter School
 Southwest Leadership Academy Charter School
 Tacony Academy Charter School
 TECH Freire Charter School
 Universal Audenried Charter High School

Private

 The Crefeld School
 Friends Select School
 Germantown Friends School
 Philadelphia Free School
 Springside Chestnut Hill Academy
 The Mill Creek School
 William Penn Charter School

Religious

 Archbishop Ryan High School
 The City School
 Cristo Rey Philadelphia High School
 Father Judge High School
 Hope Church School
 International Christian High School
 Little Flower Catholic High School for Girls
 Mercy Vocational High School
 Nazareth Academy High School
 Northeast Catholic High School
 Roman Catholic High School for Boys
 St. Hubert Catholic High School for Girls
 Saint Joseph's Preparatory School
 Saints John Neumann and Maria Goretti Catholic High School
 Talmudical Yeshiva of Philadelphia
 West Philadelphia Catholic High School

Pike County

 Delaware Valley High School, Milford
 East Stroudsburg High School North, Dingmans Ferry

Potter County

 Austin High School, Austin
 Coudersport Area Junior/Senior High School, Coudersport
 Galeton Area High School, Galeton
 Northern Potter Junior Senior High School, Ulysses
 Oswayo Valley High School, Shinglehouse

Schuylkill County

Northern/Eastern

 Mahanoy Area High School, Mahanoy City
 North Schuylkill High School, Fountain Springs
 Schuylkill Technology Center, Frackville
 Shenandoah Valley High School, Shenandoah

Tamaqua

 Marian Catholic High School
 Tamaqua Area High School

Southern/Western

 Minersville Area High School, Minersville
 Pine Grove Area High School, Pine Grove
 Tri-Valley High School, Hegins
 Williams Valley High School, Tower City

Pottsville

 Gillingham Charter School
 Nativity BVM High School
 Pottsville Area High School

Schuylkill Haven

 Blue Mountain High School
 Schuylkill Haven High School

Snyder County

 Midd-West High School, Middleburg
 Penn View Bible Institute, Penns Creek
 Selinsgrove Area High School, Selinsgrove

Somerset County

Central

 Berlin Brothersvalley High School, Berlin
 Rockwood Area Junior/Senior High School, Rockwood
 Shanksville-Stonycreek High School, Shanksville
 Somerset County Technology Center, Somerset Twp
 Somerset Area High School, Somerset

Northern

 Conemaugh Township Area Middle/Senior High School, Davidsville
 Johnstown Christian School, Benson
 North Star High School, Boswell
 Shade Junior/Senior High School, Cairnbrook
 Windber Area High School, Windber

Southern

 Meyersdale Area High School, Meyersdale
 Salisbury-Elk Lick Junior/Senior High School, Salisbury
 Turkeyfoot Valley Area Junior/Senior High School, Confluence

Sullivan County
 Sullivan County Junior/Senior High School, Laporte

Susquehanna County

 Blue Ridge High School, New Milford
 Elk Lake High School, Dimock
 Forest City Regional High School, Forest City
 Montrose Area Junior Senior High School, Montrose
 Mountain View High School, Kingsley
 Susquehanna Community High School, Susquehanna
 Susquehanna County Career & Technology Center, Springville

Tioga County

 Cowanesque Valley Junior Senior High School, Westfield
 North Penn-Liberty High School, Liberty
 Wellsboro Area High School, Wellsboro
 Williamson Senior High School, Tioga

Mansfield

 Mansfield High School
 New Covenant Academy

Union County

 Lewisburg Area High School, Lewisburg
 Mifflinburg Area High School, Mifflinburg
 SUN Area Technical Institute, New Berlin

Venango County

Franklin

 Franklin Area High School
 Rocky Grove High School

Oil City

 Oil City High School
 Venango Catholic High School
 Venango Technology Center

Seneca

 Christian Life Academy
 Cranberry Area High School

Warren County

 Eisenhower Middle/High School, Russell
 Sheffield Area Middle/High School, Sheffield
 Warren Area High School, Warren
 Youngsville High School, Youngsville

Washington County

Eastern

 California Area High School, Coal Center
 Calvary Chapel Christian School, Brownsville
 Ringgold High School, Monongahela

Charleroi

 Charleroi Area High School
 Mon Valley Career & Technology Center

Northern

 Burgettstown Junior/Senior High School, Burgettstown
 Fort Cherry Jr/Sr High School, McDonald
 Chartiers Houston High School, Houston
 Peters Township High School, Peters Twp

Canonsburg

 Canon-McMillan High School
 Western Area Career & Technology Center

Southern

 Bentworth High School, Bentleyville
 Bethlehem-Center High School, Fredericktown

Washington

 Faith Christian School
 Trinity High School
 Washington High School

Western

 Avella Area Junior/Senior High School, Avella
 McGuffey High School, Claysville

Wayne County

 Honesdale High School, Honesdale
 Wallenpaupack Area High School, Hawley

Lake Ariel

 Canaan Christian Academy
 Western Wayne High School

Westmoreland County

Central

 Central Westmoreland Career and Technology Center, New Stanton
 Hempfield Area High School, Hempfield Twp
 Jeannette High School, Jeannette

Greensburg

 Greensburg Central Catholic High School
 Greensburg-Salem High School
 Westmoreland Christian Academy

Latrobe

 Eastern Westmoreland Career & Technology Center
 Greater Latrobe Senior High School
 Dr. Robert Ketterer Charter School

Eastern

 Champion Christian School, Champion & Donegal
 Derry Area High School, Derry
 Grace Bible Academy, Bradenville
 Ligonier Valley High School, Ligonier

Mount Pleasant

 Mount Carmel Christian School
 Mount Pleasant Area Junior/Senior High School

Northern

 Burrell High School, Lower Burrell
 Franklin Regional High School, Murrysville
 Kiski Area High School, Vandergrift
 The Kiski School, Saltsburg

New Kensington

 Northern Westmoreland Career and Technology Center
 Valley Junior/Senior High School

Western

 Armbrust Christian Academy, Hunker
 Belle Vernon Area High School, Belle Vernon
 Monessen High School, Monessen
 Norwin High School, North Huntingdon
 Penn-Trafford School District, Harrison City
 Southmoreland High School, Alverton
 Yough Senior High School, Herminie

Wyoming County

 Lackawanna Trail High School, Factoryville
 Tunkhannock Area High School, Tunkhannock

York County

 Dallastown Area High School, Dallastown
 Dover Area High School, Dover
 Eastern York High School, Wrightsville
 Kennard-Dale High School, Fawn Grove
 Northeastern High School, Manchester
 Northern High School, Dillsburg
 Red Land High School, Lewisberry
 Spring Grove Area High School, Spring Grove
 Susquehannock High School, Glen Rock

Hanover

 Hanover High School
 Hope Christian School
 South Western Senior High School

Red Lion

 Red Lion Area High School
 Red Lion Christian School

York

 Bible Baptist Christian Academy
 Central York High School
 Christian School of York
 Crispus Attucks Charter School 
 Logos Academy
 West York Area High School
 William Penn Senior High School
 York Catholic High School
 York Country Day School
 York County School of Technology
 York Suburban Senior High School

See also
 List of school districts in Pennsylvania

References

External links

 
Pennsylvania
High school